Capt. George and Attella Barnard House, also known as the Atella Jane Keith House and Julius C. Jackson House, is a historic home located in Louisiana, Pike County, Missouri. It was built about 1869, and is a two-story, "L"-shaped, brick dwelling with a flat topped hipped roof and limestone foundation. It exhibits Early Classical Revival, Greek Revival, Italianate style design elements.  Its front facade is dominated by a two-story, classically detailed portico.

It was listed on the National Register of Historic Places in 1991.

References

Houses on the National Register of Historic Places in Missouri
Greek Revival houses in Missouri
Italianate architecture in Missouri
Neoclassical architecture in Missouri
Houses completed in 1869
Buildings and structures in Pike County, Missouri
National Register of Historic Places in Pike County, Missouri
1869 establishments in Missouri